Roberto Ramos (born December 28, 1994) is a Mexican professional baseball first baseman for the Diablos Rojos del México of the Mexican League. He has previously played for the LG Twins of the KBO League (KBO).

Amateur career
Born and raised in Hermosillo, Sonora, Mexico, Ramos graduated from San Fernando High School in San Fernando, California, moving there prior to his junior year. In 2013, his senior year, he batted .429 with 11 home runs and 43 RBIs. Undrafted in the 2013 Major League Baseball draft, he enrolled at College of the Canyons in Santa Clarita, California, where he played college baseball. As a freshman in 2014, he batted .317 with seven home runs and 31 RBIs in 37 games.

Professional career

Colorado Rockies
Ramos was selected by the Colorado Rockies in the 16th round of the 2014 Major League Baseball draft.

Ramos signed with Colorado and made his professional debut with the Tri-City Dust Devils, earning a promotion to the Grand Junction Rockies in July. In 39 games between the two clubs, he hit .213 with three home runs and 17 RBIs. In 2015, he returned to Grand Junction to begin the year before being promoted to the Asheville Tourists in June; in 55 games with both teams, he slashed .332/.408/.609 with 13 home runs and fifty RBIs. Ramos split the 2016 season with both Grand Junction and the Modesto Nuts, batting .304 with seven home runs and 32 RBIs in only 32 games due to missing over three months due to an injury. In 2017, he returned healthy to play 122 games with the Lancaster JetHawks, posting a .297 batting average with 13 home runs and 68 RBIs.

Ramos began 2018 with Lancaster, with whom he was named a California League All-Star along with winning the Home Run Derby before being promoted to the Hartford Yard Goats in June. In 121 games between both clubs, he hit .269/.368/.574 with 32 home runs and 77 RBIs.

Ramos spent 2019 with the Albuquerque Isotopes, earning Pacific Coast League All-Star honors. Over 127 games, he slashed .309/.400/.580 with thirty home runs and 105 RBIs. After the season, he was assigned to play in the Arizona Fall League for the Salt River Rafters.

LG Twins
On January 21, 2020, Ramos's contract was purchased by the LG Twins of the KBO League. The following day, the team announced he had officially signed to a one-year, $500,000 deal. Ramos hit 38 home runs in his first season, second-most in the league behind only Mel Rojas Jr. On December 22, 2020, Ramos re-signed with the Twins for 2021 on a contract worth $800K and another $200K of incentives. Through 51 games in 2021, Ramos struggled to the tune of a .243/.317/.422 with eight home runs and 25 RBIs before he suffered a lower back injury on June 9, and ultimately was released by the team on June 27 following the signing of Justin Bour.

Boston Red Sox
On February 8, 2022, Ramos signed a minor league contract with the Boston Red Sox. He was assigned to the Worcester Red Sox to open the season. On June 27, the Red Sox released Ramos.

Diablos Rojos del México
On July 1, 2022, Ramos signed with the Diablos Rojos del México of the Mexican League.

References

External links

1994 births
Living people
Albuquerque Isotopes players
Asheville Tourists players
Baseball players from Sonora
College of the Canyons Cougars baseball players
Diablos Rojos del México players
Grand Junction Rockies players
Hartford Yard Goats players
KBO League first basemen
Lancaster JetHawks players
LG Twins players
Mexican expatriate baseball players in South Korea
Mexican expatriate baseball players in the United States
Modesto Nuts players
Naranjeros de Hermosillo players
Sportspeople from Hermosillo
Tri-City Dust Devils players
Worcester Red Sox players